Maurois is a commune in the Nord department in northern France. Maurois station has rail connections to Douai and Saint-Quentin.

Heraldry

See also
Communes of the Nord department

References

Communes of Nord (French department)